was a town located in Nei District, Toyama Prefecture, Japan. It was famous for Owara Kaze no bon festival.

As of 2003, the town had an estimated population of 22,105 and a density of 93.33 persons per km². The total area was 236.86 km².

On April 1, 2005, Yatsuo, along with the towns of Ōsawano and Ōyama (both from Kaminiikawa District), the town of Fuchū, and the villages of Hosoiri and Yamada (all from Nei District), was merged into the expanded city of Toyama.

External links 
 Toyama City official website 

Dissolved municipalities of Toyama Prefecture
Toyama (city)